Chrzanów-Kolonia  is a village in the administrative district of Gmina Chrzanów, within Janów Lubelski County, Lublin Voivodeship, in eastern Poland.

References

Villages in Janów Lubelski County